The Māori language name Māwhera may refer to

 Greymouth, a town in New Zealand
 Grey River / Māwheranui, the river which reaches the sea at Greymouth
 Little Grey River / Māwheraiti, a tributary of the Māwheranui